Andriy Yuriyovych Skakun (born 13 September 1994) is a Ukrainian professional footballer who plays as a left winger.

References

External links
 
 

1994 births
Living people
Sportspeople from Ternopil
Ukrainian footballers
Association football forwards
FC Ahrobiznes Volochysk players
FC Nyva Ternopil players
Ukrainian First League players
Ukrainian Second League players
Ukrainian Amateur Football Championship players